The 2010–11 Florida Atlantic Owls men's basketball team represented Florida Atlantic University in the 2010–11 NCAA Division I men's basketball season. The Owls, led by head coach Mike Jarvis, played their home games at FAU Arena in Boca Raton, Florida, as members of the Sun Belt Conference.

Florida Atlantic failed to qualify for the NCAA tournament, but received an automatic bid to the 2011 NIT as the regular-season champions of the Sun Belt. The Owls were eliminated in the first round of the NIT by Miami, 85–62.

Roster 

Source

Schedule and results

|-
!colspan=9 style=|Exhibition

|-
!colspan=9 style=|Regular season

|-
!colspan=9 style=| Sun Belt tournament

|-
!colspan=9 style=| NIT

Source

References

Florida Atlantic Owls men's basketball seasons
Florida Atlantic
McNeese State
Florida Atlantic Owls men's basketball
Florida Atlantic Owls men's basketball